In Greek mythology, Melissa (Ancient Greek: Μέλισσα) may refer to the following women:

 Melissa, a nymph who discovered and taught the use of honey, and from whom bees were believed to have received their name, μέλισσαι. Bees seem to have been the symbol of nymphs, whence they themselves are sometimes called Melissae, and are sometimes said to have been metamorphosed into bees. Hence also nymphs in the form of bees are said to have guided the colonists that went to Ephesus; and the nymphs who nursed the infant Zeus are called Melissae, or Meliae.
 Melissa, daughter of the Cretan king Melissus, who, together with her sister Amalthea, fed Zeus with goats' milk. She may be the same with the above Melissa.
 Melissa, daughter of Epidamnus and mother of Dyrrhachius by Poseidon. Her father and son gave their name to the town in Illyria which was called Epidamnos and later on Dyrrhachium.

The name Melissae was transferred to priestesses in general, but more especially to those of Demeter, Persephone, and to the priestess of the Delphian Apollo. According to the scholiasts of Pindar and Euripides, priestesses received the name Melissae from the purity of the bee.

Notes

References 

 Antoninus Liberalis, The Metamorphoses of Antoninus Liberalis translated by Francis Celoria (Routledge 1992). Online version at the Topos Text Project.
Apollodorus, The Library with an English Translation by Sir James George Frazer, F.B.A., F.R.S. in 2 Volumes, Cambridge, MA, Harvard University Press; London, William Heinemann Ltd. 1921. ISBN 0-674-99135-4. Online version at the Perseus Digital Library. Greek text available from the same website.
Callimachus, Callimachus and Lycophron with an English translation by A. W. Mair ; Aratus, with an English translation by G. R. Mair, London: W. Heinemann, New York: G. P. Putnam 1921. Internet Archive
 Callimachus, Works. A.W. Mair. London: William Heinemann; New York: G.P. Putnam's Sons. 1921. Greek text available at the Perseus Digital Library.
 Lactantius, Divine Institutes translated by William Fletcher (1810-1900). From Ante-Nicene Fathers, Vol. 7. Edited by Alexander Roberts, James Donaldson, and A. Cleveland Coxe. Buffalo, NY: Christian Literature Publishing Co., 1886. Online version at the Topos Text Project.
Maurus Servius Honoratus, In Vergilii carmina comentarii. Servii Grammatici qui feruntur in Vergilii carmina commentarii; recensuerunt Georgius Thilo et Hermannus Hagen. Georgius Thilo. Leipzig. B. G. Teubner. 1881. Online version at the Perseus Digital Library.
Stephanus of Byzantium, Stephani Byzantii Ethnicorum quae supersunt, edited by August Meineike (1790-1870), published 1849. A few entries from this important ancient handbook of place names have been translated by Brady Kiesling. Online version at the Topos Text Project.
Theocritus, Idylls from The Greek Bucolic Poets translated by Edmonds, J M. Loeb Classical Library Volume 28. Cambridge, MA. Harvard University Press. 1912. Online version at theoi.com  Theocritus, Idylls edited by R. J. Cholmeley, M.A. London. George Bell & Sons. 1901. Greek text available at the Perseus Digital Library.

Nymphs
Women of Poseidon